Ola Krogseng Giæver (14 July 1885 – 25 October 1966) was a Norwegian farmer and politician for the Conservative Party.

He was born in Lyngseidet. He served as mayor of Lyngen for four periods, from 1913 to 1925. He was a deputy member of the Parliament of Norway from 1922 to 1924 and a member from 1925 to 1927, representing Troms.

References

1885 births
1966 deaths
People from Lyngen
Mayors of places in Troms
Members of the Storting
Conservative Party (Norway) politicians